Ariana Television Network (ATN) is a private television network based in Kabul, Afghanistan. The channel was launched by Afghan-American Ehsan Bayat (owner of Afghan Wireless Communication Company) in 2005 and started broadcasting internationally the following year. ATN is one of the leading television channels in Afghanistan and has terrestrial coverage in 33 of 34 provinces in the country.

History
The channel was launched in summer 2005 and aired internationally from 2006. In 2014 the channel had a new logo. That same year its sister channel Ariana News, broadcasting news all day, was launched.

Programming
ATN has social, cultural, political and entertaining programs focusing to show pure Afghan culture. Some long running shows include Entekhāb-e Binendahā (Viewer's Choice, a music show), Parwāna-hā (Butterflies, a children's show), Cinemā, Warzesh (Sports), Setārahā-ye Rangin (Colored stars, a music show) and the annual ATN Awards.

59-Minute Duel is a popular cooking show airing since 2011 in which two rival cooks have exactly 59 minutes to cook a three part course for the judges. Every week, a unique ingredient would be provided, and the meals had to be based around it. The prize is the title of "The Golden Chef", awarded to the winner after the scores had been given by the usually celebrity judges. On many occasions, the chefs would be an Afghan and a foreigner, such as a soldier from the American or British base.

Ariana has also been the product of a well known comedy character Motakhases, who appeared on the former Khanda Hāy-e Girya Dār comedy show and later on Hekāyat Hāye Motakhases.

Other airing programs of Ariana Television Network are:
 Mehmān-e Man
 Yādeman
 Yoz-Ma-Yuz (Uzbek)
 Bouy-e Māh
 Darman
 Techpedia
 Saat-e-10
 Musafir
 Sobh-o-Zendagi
 Marā Bebakhsh (Dari translation of Turkish drama Beni Affet)

Former notable programming
Top 5, a music show
Ariāna dar Nim-e roz, a talk and cultural show
Haqiqat (The Truth), an investigative political show
Khanda Hāy-e Girya Dār, a comedy show
Who Wants to Be a Millionaire?, Afghan version of the British game show
Chashme Shishayi, a cinema show

Ariana Television Network has aired various Indian soap dramas, some of which achieved high popularity in Afghanistan.
Banoo Main Teri Dulhann
Kumkum – Ek Pyara Sa Bandhan
Heena
Khwaish
Mitwa Phool Kamal Ke
Zaara
Sasural Genda Phool
Bidaai
Maayke Se Bandhi Dor

2008 journalist arrest
Ariana Television Network gained international attention when Mohammad Nasir Fayyaz, a journalist and presenter of Ariana's hard-talk political debate show Haqiqat (The Truth in English), was detained by Afghan authorities on July 29, 2008. Fayyaz was critical of members of the country's cabinet at the time. He was detained by the intelligence agency National Directorate of Security (NDS) whilst he was presenting the show, and was released after one day but again returned to detention. Amnesty International warned the Afghan government to protect press and media freedom from the NDS. He was eventually released without charge and continued to present Haqiqat.

See also
Television in Afghanistan

References

External links
 Official site 

Television stations in Afghanistan
Persian-language television stations
Television channels and stations established in 2005
Mass media in Kabul